Asia-United States relations are covered in these articles:

Foreign relations of the United States
East Asia–United States relations
Armenia–United States relations
Bangladesh–United States relations
Cambodia–United States relations
China–United States relations
Taiwan–United States relations
India–United States relations
Indonesia–United States relations
Iran–United States relations
Israel–United States relations
Japan–United States relations
Jordan–United States relations
Kazakhstan–United States relations
Kuwait–United States relations
Lebanon–United States relations

Malaysia–United States relations
Myanmar–United States relations, includes Burma
North Korea–United States relations
Pakistan–United States relations
Philippines–United States relations
Russia–United States relations
Saudi Arabia–United States relations
Singapore–United States relations
South Korea–United States relations
Syria–United States relations
Tajikistan–United States relations
Turkey–United States relations
Thailand–United States relations
 United States–Uzbekistan relations

Foreign relations of the United States